Altrincham is an electoral ward of Trafford covering the Town Centre and inner areas of Altrincham, Greater Manchester. It is represented by three local government councillors, each elected to serve a four-year term.

Councillors 
, the councillors are Daniel Jerrome (Green), Michael Welton (Green), and Geraldine Coggins (Green).

 indicates seat up for re-election.
 indicates the councillor became an independent councillor.
 indicates seat up for election following resignation of sitting councillor.

Elections in the 2020s

May 2022

May 2021

Elections in the 2010s

May 2019

May 2018 
Alex Williams, elected in 2016, resigned from his seat, creating a second vacancy.

May 2016

May 2015

May 2014

May 2012

May 2011

Matt Colledge replaced Susan Williams after she was made Baroness Williams of Trafford. Matthew Sephton subsequently replaced Matt Colledge, who stood down in 2014.

May 2010

Elections in the 2000s

May 2008

May 2007

May 2006

May 2004

May 2003

May 2002

May 2000

Elections in the 1990s

Elections in the 1980s

Elections in the 1970s

References

External links
Trafford Council

Wards of Trafford
1974 establishments in England
Altrincham